Go Away, Unicorn! is an animated children's television series produced for YTV and Disney Channel by Sonar Entertainment in association with Nelvana. Evan Thaler Hickey and Alex Ganetakos provide story editing services for the series, with Jason Groh directing. The series premiered in a sneak peek on September 7, 2018, and another on January 21, 2019. The series later premiered on February 8, 2019, on Disney Channel and is available on Disney Now.

Plot
The series, based on the book of the same name by Emily Mullock (originally published by McKellar & Martin), features a young girl named Alice and her best friend—an energetic male unicorn—as they explore their differences and realize that friendships can be found at the unlikeliest of places.

The series stars Chris Diamantopoulos (Mickey Mouse) as the eponymous Unicorn and Rebecca Husain (Beat Bugs) as Alice. Alice's other friends include Varun Saranga as Ollie, an Indian-Canadian boy whose father was a champion speller back in his homeland, and spelled the very lengthy word , which is another word for a dog; and Pixie, a cheerful, happy-go-lucky girl who loves pink glitter, tossing it into the air every now and then.

Characters
 Alice (voiced by Rebecca Husain) – A sassy 8-year-old girl who aspires to succeed in all of her endeavors. 
 Unicorn (voiced by Chris Diamantopoulos) – A cheerful and energetic male unicorn who constantly causes all kinds of shenanigans, but ultimately comes through for Alice.
 Ollie (voiced by Varun Saranga) - an Indian-Canadian boy, whose father could spell in three languages in his native country as a child.
 Pixie (voiced by Josette Halpert) - a cheerful, young, happy-go-lucky girl who loves pink glitter, tossing it into the air every now and then.
 Hugo (voiced by Jennifer Hale) - Alice's baby brother
 Tanya (voiced by Jennifer Hale) - Alice and Hugo's mom
 Chuck (voiced by Chris Diamantopoulos) - Alice and Hugo's dad

Production
Go Away, Unicorn! was under development as a co-production at Tricon Films & Television and Mercury Filmworks as of March 27, 2013 with Tricon as international distributor. The series was pick up by Disney Channels Worldwide and Corus Entertainment when Tricon was considered insolvent in December 2016. Sonar Entertainment purchased Tricon's assets including this series. By October 2017, Sonar and Nelvana began producing the planned 52 11-minute segments totaling 26 half-hour episodes, as well as 10 x one-minute shorts. The Canada Media Fund is aiding in the production of the series, while CentraIP is the worldwide licensing agent.

Episodes

Shorts (2019)
 "Wake Up, Unicorn!" (February 18, 2019)
 "In a Jam, Unicorn!" (February 19, 2019)
 "Dance Dance, Unicorn!" (February 20, 2019)
 "Black Hole, Unicorn!"   (February 21, 2019)
 "Rake and Leaf, Unicorn!" (March 8, 2019)
 "I Wish There, Unicorn!"  (May 10, 2019)

Broadcast
The show broadcast worldwide but premiere in the third quarter of 2018 on YTV in Canada before an international roll out. The series was also shown in French Canada on Télétoon.

The series made its premiere on Disney Channel in various worldwide territories in January 2019 and on the American Disney Channel on March 3, following a launch preview on the DisneyNow streaming service in December.

Merchandise
Toys have been licensed worldwide by Jazwares, and were scheduled for release during fall 2019.

Notes

References

External links
 

2010s American animated television series
2019 American television series debuts
2020 American television series endings
2010s Canadian animated television series
2018 Canadian television series debuts
2019 Canadian television series endings
Fictional unicorns
American children's animated comedy television series
American children's animated fantasy television series
Canadian children's animated comedy television series
Canadian children's animated fantasy television series
Disney Channel original programming
YTV (Canadian TV channel) original programming
Television series by Nelvana
Television series by Corus Entertainment
Animated television series about horses
Animated television series about children
American television shows based on children's books
Canadian television shows based on children's books
2010 children's books
Television about unicorns
English-language television shows